Mollah Karamineh-e Shah Morad (also Romanized as Mollah Karamīneh-e Shāh Morād; also known as Mollā Karamīneh-e Shāh Mār) is a village in Ozgoleh Rural District, Ozgoleh District, Salas-e Babajani County, Kermanshah Province, Iran. At the 2006 census, its population was 61, in 11 families.

References 

Populated places in Salas-e Babajani County